"Hickory Hill" is a historic home located near Petersburg, West Virginia.  It is located in Hardy County, West Virginia. It was built in 1809, and is a two-story brick dwelling in the Federal style.  It has a traditional five bay center entrance plan.  Also on the property are a log barn and smokehouse.

It was listed on the National Register of Historic Places in 1985.

References

External links 

Farms on the National Register of Historic Places in West Virginia
Houses on the National Register of Historic Places in West Virginia
Federal architecture in West Virginia
Houses completed in 1809
Houses in Hardy County, West Virginia
National Register of Historic Places in Hardy County, West Virginia
1809 establishments in Virginia